DXQR (93.5 FM), broadcasting as DWIZ 93.5, is a radio station owned and operated by Aliw Broadcasting Corporation. Its studio and transmitter are located along Don Apolinar Velez St. cor. Hayes St., Cagayan de Oro.

The station was formerly under the Q93 and Home Radio network from its inception on December 22, 1997 to January 16, 2023. On January 30, 2023, it, along with its provincial stations, was relaunched under the DWIZ network.

References

Aliw Broadcasting Corporation
Home Radio Network
Radio stations established in 2000
Radio stations in Cagayan de Oro